Petru Porime Tolan (born 21 March 1986 in Tîrgu Mureş, Romania) is a  Romanian aerobic gymnast. He won two world championships medals (one gold and one silver) and four European championships medals (two gold and two bronze).

References

External links

1986 births
Living people
Romanian aerobic gymnasts
Male aerobic gymnasts
Universiade medalists in gymnastics
Medalists at the Aerobic Gymnastics World Championships
Universiade silver medalists for Romania
Universiade bronze medalists for Romania
Medalists at the 2011 Summer Universiade